László Jászai (born 25 January 1967, Szeged) is a Hungarian actor.

Life
From 1985 to 1986, he was a student of Mária Gór Nagy, while he was also at the National Theatre from 1985 to 1987, and then, in 1991, he graduated from the Academy of Drama and Film in Budapest. He played in Veszprém, then in Budapest, and, in 1992, became contracted with the National Theatre.

Filmography 
 Kisváros 
 Hanussen
 Cyrano
 Európa expressz
 Rendőrsztori
 A titkos háború
 Sínjárók
 Világszám!
 A legbátrabb város
 Tűzvonalban
 Fapad

Awards 
 Farkas-Ratkó award 1994
 János Rajz award 1995
 Farkas-Ratkó award 2000
 Főnix award 2004
 Ferenc Sík-emlékgyűrű (alapítványi) 2005
 László Mensáros awards 2008

Further reading
 Magyar filmlexikon. Szerk. Veress József. Bp., Magyar Nemzeti Filmarchivum, 2005. 450-451. o.
 Jászai László. Petőfi Irodalmi Múzeum (Hozzáférés: 2015. szeptember 14.)

More information 
 ifj. Jászai László Magyar Színház, magyarszinhaz.hu (Hozzáférés: 2015. szeptember 14.)
 Biográf ki kicsoda 2002. Kortársaink életrajzi lexikona. Főszerk. Hermann Péter, összeáll., vál. A. Gergely András et al. Bp., Enciklopédia, 2001.
 Révai Új Lexikona. Főszerk. Kollega Tarsoly István. Szekszárd, Babits, 1996-. 
 Who is Who Magyarországon. Kiegészítő kötet. 2. kiad. 2004. Zug, Hübners blaues Who is Who, 2004.

References

1967 births
Hungarian actors
People from Szeged
Living people